Rohit Purohit is an Indian actor who works in Hindi television. He made his acting debut with Shaurya Aur Suhani portraying Chitwan in 2009. Purohit is best known for his portrayal of Malik Altunia in Razia Sultan, Alexander in Porus, Ranvijay Shroff in Dil Toh Happy Hai Ji and Dr. Vikrant Saxena in Dhadkan Zindaggi Kii.

Personal life
Purohit was born on 8 June 1986 in Jaipur, Rajasthan.

Purohit dated his Arjun co-actor Sheena Bajaj for six years. He married Bajaj on 22 January 2019 in Jaipur.

Career
Purohit started his acting career with Shaurya Aur Suhani portraying Chitwan. He then portrayed Marco D'Souza in an episode of Adaalat and portrayed Aryaman in Aise Karo Naa Vidaa.

Purohit went onto portray prominent role of Suraj Purohit in Sanskaar Laxmi, Bhadrasaal in Chandragupta Maurya, Varun Kashyap / Rubber Man in Hum Ne Li Hai- Shapath, Karan in Arjun. He then appeared in an episode of Encounter as Girish Sinha and in an episode of Ishq Kills as Aryan.

Purohit portrayed the lead role of Malik Altunia in Razia Sultan, a major turning point in his career. He also portrayed Dara Shikoh in the documentary series Bharatvarsh. He then portrayed Alexander in Porus and received praises for his role.

Purohit portrayed the lead role of Ranvijay "RV" Shroff in Dil Toh Happy Hai Ji and Dr. Vikrant Saxena in Dhadkan Zindaggi Kii. He also appeared as a Contestant in Box Cricket League 3.

Filmography

Television

Awards and nominations

References

External links

Year of birth unknown
Living people
21st-century Indian male actors
Indian male television actors
Indian male models
People from Jaipur
Male actors from Rajasthan
1986 births